is a Japanese corporation that produces capacitors and other discrete electronic components.

Nippon Chemi-Con was founded in 1931 by Toshio Satoh in Japan.

Price fixing 
On March 22, 2018, the European Union fined Nippon Chemi-Con €98 million for historical price fixing, alongside other companies including Nichicon and Rubycon.

Subsidiaries 
Nippon Chemi-Con has two wholly owned subsidiaries: United Chemi-Con (in the United States) and Europe Chemi-Con (in Germany).

References

External links

 Nippon Chemi-Con Corporation 
 United Chemi-Con
 Europe Chemi-Con 

Electronics companies of Japan
Defense companies of Japan
Manufacturing companies based in Tokyo
Capacitor manufacturers
Companies listed on the Tokyo Stock Exchange
Electronics companies established in 1931
1931 establishments in Japan
Japanese brands